The 1960 Tangerine Bowl (December) was an American college football bowl game played following the 1960 season, on December 30, at the Tangerine Bowl stadium in Orlando, Florida. It was the second of two Tangerine Bowls played in calendar year 1960.

Heading into the game, The Citadel finished their regular season slate with a 7–2–1 record, finishing second in the Southern Conference behind VMI.  This has been the only bowl appearance for The Citadel.

Tennessee Tech entered with an 8–2 record. They were Ohio Valley Conference champions after having finished 6–0 in conference play.  They have appeared in only one bowl game since; the 1972 Grantland Rice Bowl, which they also lost.

Neither team was ranked before or after the game.

Scoring summary

References

Tangerine Bowl
Citrus Bowl (game)
The Citadel Bulldogs football bowl games
Tennessee Tech Golden Eagles football bowl games
Tangerine Bowl
1960 in sports in Florida